Alexandria Elizabeth “Ali” Hall Holt (born 27 March 1991) is an American-born Honduran former footballer who played as a defender. She has been a member of the Honduras women's national team.

Early life
Hall was born in Park Ridge, Illinois, and Hawthorn Woods, Illinois. Her father is Honduran and her mother is American.

High school and college career
Hall has attended the Stevenson High School in Lincolnshire, Illinois and the University of Tennessee in Knoxville, Tennessee.

Club career
Hall has played for Eclipse Select SC in the United States.

International career
Although Hall initially participated in training camps for the United States youth national team, she capped for Honduras at senior level during the 2014 CONCACAF Women's Championship qualification.

International goals
Scores and results list Honduras' goal tally first

Personal life
Hall's sister Lauren has represented Honduras at youth levels.

References

1991 births
Living people
People with acquired Honduran citizenship
Honduran women's footballers
Women's association football defenders
Honduras women's international footballers
Honduran people of American descent
Sportspeople from Park Ridge, Illinois
People from Hawthorn Woods, Illinois
Soccer players from Illinois
American women's soccer players
Tennessee Volunteers women's soccer players

American people of Honduran descent